Joti Saroop  was an Indian politician. He was elected to the Lok Sabha, the lower house of the Parliament of India from Hathras, Uttar Pradesh as a member of the Republican Party of India.

References

External links
 Official biographical sketch in Parliament of India website

1927 births
Possibly living people
Republican Party of India politicians
Lok Sabha members from Uttar Pradesh
India MPs 1962–1967